Little Comets are an English indie rock trio from Jarrow and Washington, Tyne and Wear. They are described as playing "kitchen sink indie" music. In early 2009 the band were signed to Columbia Records following numerous gigs in strange locations such as lecture theatres and various modes of public transport and support from DJ Huw Stephens. After departing their major record label they released their début album, In Search of Elusive Little Comets, on 31 January 2011. The band released their second album, Life is Elsewhere, on 15 October 2012 under Dirty Hit records.

Their fourth album Worhead was released in March 2017 on the band's own label.

Career
On 9 February 2009, the band released their début single "One Night in October" through Lucky Number Records on vinyl and via digital download. The single débuted at number 3 on the independent chart and received praise from BBC Radio 1 DJs Huw Stephens, Zane Lowe and Sara Cox, all of whom played the song on their respective shows.

Having signed with Columbia Records during 2008, the band release their second single "Adultery" on 26 October 2009. The band promoted the single by touring acting as support for bands such as Hockey, The Twang and The Noisettes. Columbia terminated the contract in 2010.

The band revealed in November 2010 that their début album In Search of Elusive Little Comets would be released in the UK on 31 January 2011 both digitally and physically. The album will be produced by their guitarist Michael Coles and mixed by Rich Costey. The album was preceded by a release of the track "Joanna" on 17 January 2011.

In May 2011 it was announced on the band's website and on other official outlets that drummer Mark Harle was leaving the band to pursue other opportunities. The band decided to move several shows scheduled for May to October of the same year. They have also stated that they are sure they will find a new drummer soon enough to perform at their summer festival dates.

The band's track "Dancing Song" was used in the Radox advert in the summer of 2012.

In January 2014, the band announced it would be releasing three EPs and an album in the forthcoming year, starting with The Gentle EP, released 23 February 2014 and followed by Salt EP, which was released on 16 June.

In 2015 their third album Hope Is Just a State of Mind was released and charted at 31 on the UK Albums Chart.

The band announced their fourth album Worhead through their website in September 2016. It was released on 10 March 2017 via The Smallest Label.

Discography

Studio albums

EPs

Singles

Members
Current members
 Michael Coles – lead guitar, backing vocals (2008–present)
 Robert Coles – lead vocals, guitar, piano (2008–present)
 Matt Hall – bass guitar, backing vocals (2008–present)

Touring musicians
Matt Saxon – keyboards, guitar, backing vocals, samples (2015–present)
Nathan Greene – drums (2015–present)

Former members
 Mark Harle – drums (2008–2011)
 David "Greenie" Green – drums (2011–2015)

References

External links
 
interview with Little Comets at Il Dormiglione
Interview on BBC Tyne

English indie rock groups
2008 establishments in England
Musical groups established in 2008